Asalha Puja (also known as Asadha Puja or Asanha Bucha in Thailand) is a Theravada Buddhist festival which typically takes place in July, on the full moon of the month of Āsādha. It is celebrated in Indonesia, Cambodia (ពិធីបុណ្យអាសាឡ្ហបូជា), Thailand, Sri Lanka, Laos, Myanmar and in countries with Theravada Buddhist populations. In Indonesia, the festival is centered at Mendut Temple and Borobudur Temple, Central Java.

Asalha Puja, also known as Dharma Day, is one of Theravada Buddhism's most important festivals, celebrating as it does the Buddha's first sermon, the "Sermon in the Deer Park" at Sarnath, in which he set out to his five former associates the doctrine that had come to him following his enlightenment. This first pivotal sermon, often referred to as “setting into motion the wheel of dhamma,” is the teaching which is encapsulated for Buddhists in the Four Noble Truths: there is suffering (dukkha); suffering is caused by craving (tanha); there is a state (nibbana) beyond suffering and craving; and finally, the way to nirvana is via the Noble Eightfold Path.  All the various schools and traditions of Buddhism revolve around the central doctrine of the Four Noble Truths.

This first sermon is not only the first structured discourse given by the Buddha after his enlightenment, it also contains the essence of all his subsequent teaching. At the end of the talk, one of the five participants recounted his understanding of what had been said and asked to be received as a disciple, a request the Buddha granted, thus establishing the first order of monks.

The day is observed by donating offerings to temples and listening to sermons.  The following day is known in Thailand as  Wan Khao Phansa; it is the first day of  vassa, the Theravada rains retreat.

See also
Dhammacakkappavattana Sutta
Māgha Pūjā
Visakha Puja
Wan Ok Phansa
Vassa
Pavarana
Uposatha
Ubon Ratchathani Candle Festival
Thadingyut Festival
Kandy Esala Perahera, a tradition held in Kandy, Sri Lanka during Asalha Puja part of the Esala Mangallaya festival tradition

References

External links
 Dhammacakkappavattana Sutta - The Buddha's first discourse
 Wan Asana Bucha and Wan Khao Pansa in Thailand
 Asalha Puja - The Beginning of Buddhism

Buddhist festivals in Thailand
Buddhist holidays
July observances
Public holidays in Sri Lanka
Public holidays in Thailand
Theravada
Observances set by the Burmese calendar
Observances held on the full moon